Robinson is a western suburb of Albany in southern Western Australia, west of Albany's central business district. Its local government area is the City of Albany.  The suburb has a median age of 43.

Frenchman Bay Road passes through the suburb to Little Grove and then on to Torndirrup National Park and Frenchman Bay.

In March 2010, the area was evacuated as a result of a catastrophic bushfire. The fire started after a motorcycle accident and quickly spread through the surrounding bushland.

Fire fighters battled flames as high as  using two water bombers and a helicopter. The fire was eventually contained following overnight rain.

References

Suburbs of Albany, Western Australia